Tati is a 1973 Brazilian drama film directed by Bruno Barreto. It was entered into the 8th Moscow International Film Festival.

Cast
 Dina Sfat as Manuela
 Daniela Vasconcelos as Tati
 Hugo Carvana as Capitão Peixoto
 Marcelo Carvalho
 Wilson Grey
 Noelza Guimaraes
 Vanda Lacerda
 Zezé Macedo
 Elizabeth Martins
 Geraldo Affonso Miranda (as Geraldo Miranda)
 Paulo Neves
 Fábio Sabag

References

External links
 

1973 films
1973 drama films
Brazilian drama films
1970s Portuguese-language films
Films directed by Bruno Barreto
1973 directorial debut films